List of Channel Islands railways:

 Alderney Railway (working)
 Guernsey Railway (closed)
 Jersey Railway (closed)
 Jersey Eastern Railway (closed)

References

 

Channel Islands
Rail transport in the Channel Islands